HOI or Hoi may refer to:

Hearts of Iron, a 2002 computer game
Home insurance or homeowners insurance
Hypoiodous acid, chemical formula HOI
Hoi District, Aichi, a former district of Japan
Hoxnian geological stage, HOI is sub-stage I
Carsten Høi (born 1957), Danish chess Grandmaster
Hao Airport IATA code
Hoi (video game), a 1992 video game for the Amiga

See also
 Hoe (food), various Korean raw fish dishes 
 Hoi polloi
 Oi (interjection)